USS Pharris (FF-1094) was a  named after Medal of Honor recipient Lieutenant Commander Jackson C. Pharris. It was originally designated as destroyer escort DE-1094 and later reclassified as a frigate with the designation FF-1094 in the United States Navy. In 1992 the ship was decommissioned and transferred to the Mexican Navy. It was recommissioned as ARM Victoria, named after Mexico's first president, Guadalupe Victoria.

In 1986 the  Pharris while assigned to the USS America (CV-66) battle group assisted in Operation El Dorado Canyon which commenced early on the afternoon of 14 April 1986. At the conclusion of this operation the Pharris was awarded the Navy Expeditionary Medal and the Navy Unit Commendation.

During the 1987–1988 Mediterranean cruise, Pharris escorted Mighty Servant 2 carrying  from the entrance of the Persian Gulf to about halfway up the Red Sea. Pharris was awarded the Armed Forces Expeditionary Medal for its part in Operation Earnest Will.

On 8 February 1991, during a port visit in the Madeira Islands, two Canadian divers from  drowned when they were sucked into the cooling intake of Pharris while conducting a hull search.

In fiction
In Tom Clancy's 1986 novel, Red Storm Rising, Pharris suffers extreme damage following a torpedo attack by a Victor III submarine (the bow forward of the ASROC mounts was torn off), warranting an extensive repair.

References

Ships built in Bridge City, Louisiana
Knox-class frigates
Ships transferred from the United States Navy to the Mexican Navy
1972 ships
Cold War frigates and destroyer escorts of the United States